Monds is a surname. Notable people with the surname include:

 Fabian Monds (born 1940), public servant
 John Monds (born 1965), candidate for office
 Mario Monds (born 1976), footballer
 Wonder Monds (born 1952), American football player

See also
 Mond (disambiguation)